William Gresham (1870 – after 1894) was an English footballer who made 35 appearances in the Football League playing for Lincoln City as a goalkeeper. He played for Gainsborough Trinity before joining Lincoln in 1892 in time to play in their first Football League match, alongside his younger brother James. Both brothers were ever-present in the 1892–93 Football League season.

References

1870 births
Year of death missing
Footballers from Liverpool
English footballers
Association football goalkeepers
Gainsborough Trinity F.C. players
Lincoln City F.C. players
English Football League players
Date of birth missing
Place of death missing